The 1971–72 season would be the Royals final season in Cincinnati. The franchise continued to struggle and missed the playoffs for the 5th year in a row. The Royals finished the season with a record of 30 wins and 52 losses. Prior to the season, the Royals were sold to a group of 10 businessmen from Kansas City. The new ownership group paid $5 million for the franchise and a decision was reached to move the team after the season. The franchise would relocate west where they would be reborn as the Kansas City-Omaha Kings.

Draft picks

Roster

Regular season

Season standings

Record vs. opponents

Game log

Awards and honors
 Tiny Archibald, All-NBA Second Team

References

 Royals on Basketball Reference

Cincinnati
Sacramento Kings seasons
Cincinnati
Cincinnati